The 2015–16 Eredivisie season was the 60th season of the Eredivisie since its establishment in 1955. Defending champions PSV retained their title.

Teams 
A total of 18 teams took part in the league: the top 15 teams from the 2014–15 season, two promotion/relegation playoff winners and the 2014–15 Eerste Divisie champions.

NEC, the champion of the 2014–15 Eerste Divisie, and play-off winner Roda JC returned to the Eredivisie after just one season. De Graafschap, the other play-off winner, returned to the highest level for the first time since the 2011–12 season.

Personnel and kits 

Note: Flags indicate national team as has been defined under FIFA eligibility rules. Players and Managers may hold more than one non-FIFA nationality.

Managerial changes

Standings

Results

Number of teams by provinces

Season statistics

Top scorers

Hat-tricks 

Note
4 Player scored 4 goals

Assists

Discipline

Player 
Most yellow cards: 10
Lucas Bijker (Heerenveen)
Funso Ojo (Willem II)
Most red cards: 2
Joey van den Berg (Heerenveen)
Ouasim Bouy (PEC Zwolle)
Sander Fischer (Excelsior)
Derrick Luckassen (AZ)
Mark van der Maarel (Utrecht)
Harm Zeinstra (Cambuur)

Club 
Most yellow cards: 65
Heerenveen
Most red cards: 5
Cambuur
Utrecht

Attendances

Play-offs

European competition 
Four teams played for a spot in the 2016–17 UEFA Europa League third qualifying round.

Key: * = Play-off winners, (a) = Wins because of away goals rule, (e) = Wins after extra time in second leg, (p) = Wins after penalty shoot-out.

Promotion/relegation play-offs 
Ten teams, two from the Eredivisie and eight from the Eerste Divisie, played for two spots in the 2016–17 Eredivisie, the remaining eight teams play in the 2016–17 Eerste Divisie.

Key: * = Play-off winners, (a) = Wins because of away goals rule, (e) = Wins after extra time in second leg, (p) = Wins after penalty shoot-out.

References

External links 
 

2015-16
Neth
1